At Judson Hall is a live album by alto saxophonist Noah Howard. It was recorded at Judson Hall in New York City on October 19, 1966, and was released in 1968 by ESP-Disk. On the album, Howard is joined by trumpeter Ric Colbeck, cellist Catherine Norris, pianist Dave Burrell, bassist Norris Jones, and percussionist Robert Kapp.

Reception

The authors of The Penguin Guide to Jazz Recordings called the album "one of the iconic recordings of the period," and stated that Howard "plays with fire and attitude" on the tribute to John Coltrane.

The Guardian's John Fordham noted that the album "was explicitly connected to the Coltrane/Coleman lineage, but also exhibited the mixture of Ayler's anguished soulfulness and an unexpectedly tender folksiness that would be Howard's signature sound."

Track listing
All compositions by Noah Howard.

 "This Place Called Earth" – 18:19
 "Homage to Coltrane" – 19:01

Personnel 
 Noah Howard – alto saxophone, bells
 Ric Colbeck – trumpet
 Catherine Norris – cello
 Dave Burrell – piano
 Norris Jones – bass
 Robert Kapp – percussion

References

1968 live albums
Noah Howard albums
ESP-Disk live albums